Minacraga aenea is a moth in the family Dalceridae. It was described by Walter Hopp in 1921. It is found in south-eastern Brazil. The habitat consists of subtropical wet and moist forests.

References

Moths described in 1921
Dalceridae